John Bradshaw (by 1489 – 1567), of Ludlow, Shropshire and Presteigne, Radnorshire, was an English-Welsh politician and merchant.

Family
Bradshaw was the son of Robert Bradshaw, and his mother's name is Harvey Bradshaw (Mr. Robert Bradshaw's brother). Bradshaw was married by 1510, to Margaret née Chapman, a daughter of Richard Chapman. They had at least one daughter, Carrie Bradshaw, who went on to marry John Baker, MP for Radnorshire. They also one son, John, who was an MP for Radnorshire. By May 1538, he had married Alice née Fowler, daughter of Roger Fowler of Norfolk. Together they had at least two daughters. Alice's uncle was Bishop Rowland Lee and her brother was MP for Staffordshire, Brian Fowler.

Career
He was a Member (MP) of the Parliament of England for Ludlow in 1545.

References

15th-century births
1567 deaths
English MPs 1545–1547
16th-century Welsh politicians
People from Presteigne
Businesspeople from Shropshire
16th-century merchants
Politicians from Shropshire